Erzsébet Simonyi (21 July 1915–24 September 1993) was a veterinarian in Hungary and the first woman to gain a veterinary degree in Hungary (1937). She began a private practice in 1940 and from 1948 to 1952 worked at Phylaxia Vaccine Production Company. In 1952, she became the first woman to head a scientific institution in Hungary, when she was asked to found the Veterinary Vaccine Control Institute for the Department of Agriculture. The purpose of the institute was to develop immunization processes and controls for developing and administering vaccines and Simonyi led it until 1971. In 2012, the Institute became the Directorate of Veterinary Products of the National Food Chain Safety Office.

Early life
Erzsébet Schwartz was born on 21 July 1915 in Budapest in the Kingdom of Hungary to Emánuel Schwartz. Her father operated a veterinary practice in the Angyalföld neighborhood. She completed her secondary studies with honors in 1933, but was not allowed to study medicine. Encouraged by Károly Jármai, a professor of veterinary medicine and at that time vice-rector of the József Nádor University of Technology and Economics, Schwartz enrolled as a temporary student of veterinary science. Her full admission was dependent on an evaluation of her first year performance. She succeeded in her courses and decided not to transfer to medicine, remaining in the veterinary school. She graduated with her degree in 1937, and defended her doctoral thesis, Praecipitatiós kísérletek polysaccharida-antigénnel gastrophilosis esetén (Precipitation Experiments with Polysaccharide Antigen in Cases of Gastrophilosis) in 1939.

Career
Because of the war, Schwartz, now known as Simonyi, was unable to secure a research position at the university and opened a private animal practice in 1940. In 1945, she became the secretary of the Free Trade Union of Hungarian Veterinarians, and from 1946 to 1948 served as the organization's general secretary. In 1948, she began working as a researcher at Phylaxia Vaccine Production Company and worked there until 1952. From 1950, Simonyi also was a Lecturer at the Hungarian Academy of Sciences. In 1952, she began working as a researcher for the Ministry of Agriculture producing vaccines for the veterinary department. 

Before the year was out, she was asked to found the Állatgyógyászati Oltóanyag-ellenőrző Intéze (Veterinary Vaccine Control Institute). She served as director and lead researcher of the Institute and was the first woman scientist in Hungary to lead a scientific institution. Under her leadership, the Institute focused on developing immunization processes and control procedures for administering and producing vaccines. Simonyi's research interest were primarily with parasitology and virology of animals and she studied bovine viral diarrhea, canine infectious hepatitis, and swine fever. She was one of the first scientists in Hungary to detect pathogenic virus in primary cell cultures. She led the Institute until her retirement in 1971, and then earned her Candidate's Degree with a dissertation summarizing her career in 1972.

Death and legacy
Simonyi died on 24 September 1993 in Budapest. She is remembered as the first woman to earn a veterinary degree, first woman to head a scientific institute, and first woman to obtain a Candidate's Degree in Hungary. The Veterinary Vaccine Control Institute, which she founded became the National Food Chain Safety Office's Directorate of Veterinary Products in 2012 and it continues to authorize and control veterinary vaccines throughout the country.

Selected works

References

Citations

Bibliography

1915 births
1993 deaths
Scientists from Budapest
Budapest University of Technology and Economics alumni
Hungarian women scientists
Hungarian veterinarians